Crimea is a peninsula in Eastern Europe, on the northern coast of the Black Sea, almost entirely surrounded by the Black Sea and the smaller Sea of Azov. The Isthmus of Perekop connects the peninsula to Kherson Oblast in mainland Ukraine. To the east, the Crimean Bridge, constructed in 2018, spans the Strait of Kerch, linking the peninsula with Krasnodar Krai in Russia. The Arabat Spit, located to the northeast, is a narrow strip of land that separates the Syvash lagoons from the Sea of Azov. Across the Black Sea to the west lies Romania and to the south is Turkey. The largest city is Sevastopol. The region has a population of 2.4 million, and has been under Russian occupation since 2014.

Called the Tauric Peninsula until the early modern period, Crimea has historically been at the boundary between the classical world and the steppe. Greeks  colonized its southern fringe and were absorbed by the Roman and Byzantine Empires and successor states while remaining culturally Greek. Some cities became trading colonies of Genoa, until conquered by the Ottoman Empire. Throughout this time the interior was occupied by a changing cast of steppe nomads. In the 14th century, it became part of the Golden Horde; the Crimean Khanate emerged as a successor state. In the 15th century, the Khanate became a dependency of the Ottoman Empire. Lands controlled by Russia and Poland-Lithuania were often the target of slave raids during this period. In 1783, the Russian Empire annexed Crimea after an earlier war with Turkey. Crimea's strategic position led to the 1854 Crimean War and many short lived regimes following the 1917 Russian Revolution. When the Bolsheviks secured Crimea, it became an autonomous soviet republic within Russia. During World War II, Crimea was downgraded to an oblast. In 1944, Crimean Tatars were ethnically cleansed and deported under the orders of Joseph Stalin, in what has been described as a cultural genocide. The USSR transferred Crimea to Ukraine on the 300th anniversary of the Pereyaslav Treaty in 1954.

After Ukrainian independence in 1991, the central government and the Republic of Crimea clashed, with the region being granted  more autonomy. The Soviet fleet in Crimea was also in contention, but a 1997 treaty allowed Russia to continue basing its fleet in Sevastopol. In 2014, the Russians occupied the peninsula and organized an illegal referendum in support of Russian annexation, but most countries recognize Crimea as Ukrainian territory.

Name
The classical name for Crimea, Tauris or Taurica, is from the Greek Ταυρική (Taurikḗ), after the peninsula's Scytho-Cimmerian inhabitants, the Tauri. Today, the Crimean Tatar name of the peninsula is Qırım, while the Russian is Крым (Krym), and the Ukrainian is Крим (Krym).

Strabo (Geography vii 4.3, xi. 2.5), Polybius, (Histories 4.39.4), and Ptolemy (Geographia. II, v 9.5) refer variously to the Strait of Kerch as the Κιμμερικὸς Βόσπορος (Kimmerikos Bosporos, romanized spelling, Bosporus Cimmerius), its easternmost part as the Κιμμέριον Ἄκρον (Kimmerion Akron, Roman name: Promontorium Cimmerium), as well as to the city of Cimmerium and thence the name of the Kingdom of the Cimmerian Bosporus (Κιμμερικοῦ Βοσπόρου).

The city Staryi Krym ('Old Crimea'), served as a capital of the Crimean province of the Golden Horde. Between 1315 and 1329 CE, the Arab writer Abū al-Fidā recounted a political fight in 1300–1301 CE which resulted in a rival's decapitation and his head being sent "to the Crimea", apparently in reference to the peninsula, although some sources hold that the name of the capital was extended to the entire peninsula at some point during Ottoman suzerainty (1441–1783).

The origin of the word Qırım is uncertain. Suggestions argued in various sources include:
 a corruption of Cimmerium (Greek, Kimmerikon, Κιμμερικόν).
 a derivation from the Turkic term qirum ("fosse, trench"), from qori- ("to fence, protect").

Other suggestions either unsupported or contradicted by sources, apparently based on similarity in sound, include:
 a derivation from the Greek Cremnoi (Κρημνοί, in post-classical Koiné Greek pronunciation, Crimni, i.e., "the Cliffs", a port on Lake Maeotis (Sea of Azov) cited by Herodotus in The Histories 4.20.1 and 4.110.2). However, Herodotus identifies the port not in Crimea, but as being on the west coast of the Sea of Azov. No evidence has been identified that this name was ever in use for the peninsula.

 The Turkic term (e.g., in ) is related to the Mongolian appellation kerm "wall", but sources indicate that the Mongolian appellation of the Crimean peninsula of Qaram is phonetically incompatible with kerm/kerem and therefore deriving from another original term.

The spelling "Crimea" is the Italian form, i.e., la Crimea, since at least the 17th century and the "Crimean peninsula" becomes current during the 18th century, gradually replacing the classical name of Tauric Peninsula in the course of the 19th century. In English usage since the early modern period the Crimean Khanate is referred to as Crim Tartary.

The omission of the definite article in English ("Crimea" rather than "the Crimea") became common during the later 20th century.
The classical name was used in 1802 in the name of the Russian Taurida Governorate. While it was replaced with Krym in the Soviet Union and has had no official status since 1921, it is still used by some institutions in Crimea, such as the Taurida National University, the Tavriya Simferopol football club, or the Tavrida federal highway.

History

Ancient history

The recorded history of the Crimean Peninsula begins around the fifth century BCE when several Greek colonies were established along its Southern Coast, the most important of which was Chersonesos near modern-day Sevastopol, with Scythians and Tauri in the hinterland to the north. The Tauri gave the name the Tauric Peninsula, which Crimea was called into the early modern period. The southern coast gradually consolidated into the Bosporan Kingdom which was annexed by Pontus and then became a client kingdom of Rome from 63 BCE to 341 CE.

Medieval history

The south coast remained Greek in culture for almost two thousand years including under Roman successor states, the Byzantine Empire (341–1204 CE), the Empire of Trebizond (1204–1461 CE), and the independent Principality of Theodoro (ended 1475 CE). In the 13th century, some Crimean port cities were controlled by the Venetians and by the Genovese, but the interior was much less stable, enduring a long series of conquests and invasions. In the medieval period, it was partially conquered by Kievan Rus' whose prince was baptized at Sevastopol starting the Christianization of Kievan Rus'.

Mongol Conquest (1238–1449)
The north and centre of Crimea fell to the Mongol Golden Horde, although the south coast was still controlled by the Christian Principality of Theodoro and Genoese colonies. The Genoese–Mongol Wars were fought between the 13th and 15th centuries for control of south Crimea.

Crimean Khanate (1443–1783)

In the 1440s the Crimean Khanate formed out of the collapse of the horde but quite rapidly itself became  subject to the Ottoman Empire, which also conquered the coastal areas which had kept independent of the Khanate. A major source of prosperity in these times were frequents raids into Russia for slaves.

Russian Empire (1783–1917)

 
In 1774, the Ottoman Empire was defeated by Catherine the Great with the Treaty of Küçük Kaynarca making the Tatars of the Crimea politically independent. Catherine the Great's incorporation of the Crimea in 1783 into the Russian Empire increased Russia's power in the Black Sea area.

From 1853 to 1856, the strategic position of the peninsula in controlling the Black Sea meant that it was the site of the principal engagements of the Crimean War, where Russia lost to a French-led alliance.

Russian Civil War (1917–1921) 

During the Russian Civil War, Crimea changed hands many times and was where Wrangel's anti-Bolshevik White Army made their last stand. Many anti-Communist fighters and civilians escaped to Istanbul but up to 150,000 were killed in Crimea.

Soviet Union (1921–1991)

In 1921 the Crimean Autonomous Soviet Socialist Republic was created as part of the Russian Soviet Federative Socialist Republic. It was occupied by Germany from 1942 to 1944 during the Second World War. After the Soviets regained control in 1944, they deported the Crimean Tartars and several other nationalities to elsewhere in the USSR. The autonomous republic was dissolved in 1945, and Crimea became an oblast of the Russian SFSR. It was transferred to the Ukrainian SSR in 1954, on the 300th anniversary of the Treaty of Pereyaslav.

Ukraine (1991–present)

With the dissolution of the Soviet Union and Ukrainian independence in 1991 most of the peninsula was reorganized as the Republic of Crimea, although in 1995 the Republic was forcibly abolished by Ukraine with the Autonomous Republic of Crimea established firmly under Ukrainian authority.  A 1997 treaty partitioned the Soviet Black Sea Fleet, allowing Russia to continue basing its fleet in Sevastopol, with the lease extended in 2010.

Russian occupation (2014–present)

In 2014, Crimea saw intense demonstrations against the removal of the Russia-leaning Ukrainian president Viktor Yanukovych in Kyiv. Protests culminated in Russian forces occupying strategic points in Crimea and the Russian-organized Republic of Crimea declared independence from Ukraine following an illegal and internationally unrecognized referendum supporting reunification. Russia then claimed to have annexed Crimea, although most countries still recognize Crimea as part of Ukraine.

Geography

Much of the natural border between the Crimean Peninsula and the Ukrainian mainland comprises the Syvash or "Rotten Sea", a large system of shallow lagoons stretching along the western shore of the Sea of Azov. Besides the isthmus of Perekop, the peninsula is connected to the Kherson Oblast's Henichesk Raion by bridges over the narrow Chonhar and Henichesk straits and over Kerch Strait to the Krasnodar Krai. The northern part of Arabat Spit is administratively part of Henichesk Raion in Kherson Oblast, including its two rural communities of Shchaslyvtseve and Strilkove.

Geographers generally divide the peninsula into three zones: the steppe, the Crimean Mountains, and the Southern Coast.

Places

Given its long history and many conquerors, most towns in Crimea have several names.

It was often fortified and sometimes garrisoned by the Turks. The North Crimean Canal now crosses it to bring water from the Dnieper. To the west Karkinit Bay separates the Tarkhankut Peninsula from the mainland. On the north side of the peninsula is Chernomorskoe/Kalos Limen. On the south side is the large Donuzlav Bay and the port and ancient Greek settlement of Yevpatoria/Kerkinitis/Gözleve. The coast then runs south to Sevastopol/Chersonesus, a good natural harbor, great naval base and the largest city on the peninsula. At the head of Sevastopol Bay stands Inkermann/Kalamita. South of Sevastopol is the small Heracles Peninsula.

South: In the south, between the Crimean Mountains and the sea runs a narrow coastal strip which was held by the Genoese and (after 1475) by the Turks. Under Russian rule it became a kind of riviera. In Soviet times the many palaces were replaced with dachas and health resorts. From west to east are: Heracles Peninsula; Balaklava/Symbalon/Cembalo, a smaller natural harbor south of Sevastopol; Foros, the southernmost point; Alupka with the Vorontsov Palace (Alupka); Gaspra; Yalta; Gurzuf; Alushta. Further east is Sudak/Sougdia/Soldaia with its Genoese fort. Further east still is Theodosia/Kaffa/Feodosia, once a great slave-mart and a kind of capital for the Genoese and Turks. Unlike the other southern ports, Feodosia has no mountains to its north. At the east end of the  Kerch Peninsula is Kerch/Panticapaeum, once the capital of the Bosporian Kingdom. Just south of Kerch the new Crimean Bridge (opened in 2018) connects Crimea to the Taman Peninsula.

Sea of Azov: There is little on the south shore. The west shore is marked by the Arabat Spit. Behind it is the Syvash or "Putrid Sea", a system of lakes and marshes which in the far north extend west to the Perekop Isthmus. Road- and rail-bridges cross the northern part of Syvash.

Interior: Most of the former capitals of Crimea stood on the north side of the mountains. Mangup/Doros (Gothic, Theodoro). Bakhchisarai (1532–1783).
Southeast of Bakhchisarai is the cliff-fort of Chufut-Kale/Qirq Or which was used in more warlike times. Simferopol/Ak-Mechet, the modern capital. Karasu-Bazar/Bilohorsk was a commercial center. Solkhat/Staryi Krym was the old Tatar capital. Towns on the northern steppe area are all modern, notably Dzhankoi, a major road- and rail-junction.

Rivers: The longest is the Salhyr, which rises southeast of Simferopol and flows north and northeast to the Sea of Azov. The Alma flows west to reach the Black Sea between Yevpatoria and Sevastopol. The shorter Chornaya flows west to Sevastopol Bay.

Nearby: East of the Kerch Strait the Ancient Greeks founded colonies at Phanagoria (at the head of Taman Bay), Hermonassa (later Tmutarakan and Taman), Gorgippia (later a Turkish port and now Anapa). At the northeast point of the Sea of Azov at the mouth of the Don River were Tanais, Azak/Azov and now Rostov-on-Don. North of the peninsula the Dnieper turns westward and enters the Black Sea through the east–west Dnieper-Bug Estuary which also receives the Bug River. At the mouth of the Bug stood Olvia. At the mouth of the estuary is Ochakiv. Odessa stands where the coast turns southwest. Further southwest is Tyras/Akkerman/Bilhorod-Dnistrovskyi.

Crimean Mountains

These mountains are backed by secondary parallel ranges.

Some Greek myths state that this cape was supposedly crowned with the temple of Artemis where Iphigeneia officiated as priestess.
Uchan-su, on the south slope of the mountains, is the highest waterfall in Crimea.

Hydrography

There are 257 rivers and major streams on the Crimean peninsula; they are primarily fed by rainwater, with snowmelt playing a very minor role. This makes for significant annual fluctuation in water flow, with many streams drying up completely during the summer. The largest rivers are the Salhyr (Salğır, Салгир), the Kacha (Кача), the Alma (Альма), and the Belbek (Бельбек). Also important are the Kokozka (Kökköz or Коккозка), the Indole (Indol or Индо́л), the Chorna (Çorğun, Chernaya or Чёрная), the Derekoika (Dereköy or Дерекойка), the Karasu-Bashi (Biyuk-Karasu or Биюк-Карасу) (a tributary of the Salhyr river), the Burulcha (Бурульча) (also a tributary of the Salhyr), the Uchan-su, and the Ulu-Uzen'. The Alma and the Kacha are the second- and third-longest rivers.

There are more than fifty salt lakes and salt pans on the peninsula. The largest of them is Lake Sasyk (Сасык) on the southwest coast; others include Aqtas, Koyashskoye, Kiyatskoe, Kirleutskoe, Kizil-Yar, Bakalskoe, and Donuzlav. The general trend is for the former lakes to become salt pans. A number of dams have created reservoirs; among the largest are the Simferopolskoye, Alminskoye, the Taygansky and the Belogorsky just south of Bilohirsk in Bilohirsk Raion. The North Crimea Canal, which transports water from the Dnieper, is the largest of the man-made irrigation channels on the peninsula.

Crimea is facing an unprecedented water shortage crisis.

Steppe

Seventy-five percent of the remaining area of Crimea consists of semiarid prairie lands, a southward continuation of the Pontic–Caspian steppe, which slope gently to the northwest from the foothills of the Crimean Mountains.
Numerous kurgans, or burial mounds, of the ancient Scythians are scattered across the Crimean steppes.

Southern Coast

The terrain that lies south of the sheltering Crimean Mountain range is of an altogether different character. Here, the narrow strip of coast and the slopes of the mountains are smothered with greenery. This "riviera" stretches along the southeast coast from capes Fiolent and Aya, in the south, to Feodosia. It is studded with summer sea-bathing resorts such as Alupka, Yalta, Gurzuf, Alushta, Sudak, and Feodosia. During the years of Soviet rule, the resorts and dachas of this coast served as prime perquisites of the politically loyal. In addition, vineyards and fruit orchards are located in the region. Fishing, mining, and the production of essential oils are also important. Numerous Crimean Tatar villages, mosques, monasteries, and palaces of the Russian imperial family and nobles are found here, as well as picturesque ancient Greek and medieval castles.

The Crimean Mountains and the southern coast are part of the Crimean Submediterranean forest complex ecoregion. The natural vegetation consists of scrublands, woodlands, and forests, with a climate and vegetation similar to the Mediterranean Basin.

Climate

Crimea is located between the temperate and subtropical climate belts and is characterized by warm and sunny weather. It is characterized by diversity and the presence of microclimates. The northern parts of Crimea have a moderate continental climate with short but cold winters and moderately hot dry summers. In the central and mountainous areas the climate is transitional between the continental climate to the north and the Mediterranean climate to the south. Winters are mild at lower altitudes (in the foothills) and colder at higher altitudes. Summers are hot at lower altitudes and warm in the mountains. A subtropical, Mediterranean climate dominates the southern coastal regions, is characterized by mild winters and moderately hot, dry summers.

The climate of Crimea is influenced by its geographic location, relief, and influences from the Black sea. The Southern Coast is shielded from cold air masses coming from the north and, as a result, has milder winters. Maritime influences from the Black Sea are restricted to coastal areas; in the interior of the peninsula the maritime influence is weak and does not play an important role. Because a high-pressure system is located north of Crimea in both summer and winter, winds predominantly come from the north and northeast year-round. In winter these winds bring in cold, dry continental air, while in summer they bring in dry and hot weather. Winds from the northwest bring warm and wet air from the Atlantic Ocean, causing precipitation during spring and summer. As well, winds from the southwest bring very warm and wet air from the subtropical latitudes of the Atlantic Ocean and the Mediterranean sea and cause precipitation during fall and winter.

For every  increase in altitude, temperatures decrease by  while precipitation increases. The frost-free period ranges from 160 to 200 days in the steppe and mountain regions to 240–260 days on the south coast.

The Crimean mountains greatly influence the amount of precipitation present in the peninsula. However, most of Crimea (88.5%) receives  of precipitation per year. Snowfall is common in the mountains during winter.

Most of the peninsula receives more than 2,000 sunshine hours per year; it reaches up to 2,505 sunshine hours in Qarabiy yayla in the Crimean Mountains. As a result, the climate favors recreation and tourism. Because of its climate and subsidized travel-packages from Russian state-run companies, the southern coast has remained a popular resort for Russian tourists.

Strategic value

 The Black Sea ports of Crimea provide quick access to the Eastern Mediterranean, Balkans and Middle East. Historically, possession of the southern coast of Crimea was sought after by most empires of the greater region since antiquity (Roman, Byzantine, Ottoman, Russian, British and French, Nazi German, Soviet).
The nearby Dnieper River is a major waterway and transportation route that crosses the European continent from north to south and ultimately links the Black Sea with the Baltic Sea, of strategic importance since the historical trade route from the Varangians to the Greeks. The Black Sea serves as an economic thoroughfare connecting the Caucasus region and the Caspian Sea to central and Eastern Europe.

According to the International Transport Workers' Federation,  there were at least 12 operating merchant seaports in Crimea.

Economy

In 2016 Crimea had Nominal GDP of US$7 billion and US$3,000 per capita.

The main branches of the modern Crimean economy are agriculture and fishing oysters pearls, industry and manufacturing, tourism, and ports. Industrial plants are situated for the most part in the southern coast (Yevpatoria, Sevastopol, Feodosia, Kerch) regions of the republic, few northern (Armiansk, Krasnoperekopsk, Dzhankoi), aside from the central area, mainly Simferopol okrug and eastern region in Nizhnegorsk (few plants, same for Dzhankoj) city. Important industrial cities include Dzhankoi, housing a major railway connection, Krasnoperekopsk and Armiansk, among others.

After the Russian annexation of Crimea in early 2014 and subsequent sanctions targeting Crimea, the tourist industry suffered major losses for two years. The flow of holidaymakers dropped 35 percent in the first half of 2014 over the same period of 2013. The number of tourist arrivals reached a record in 2012 at 6.1 million. According to the Russian administration of Crimea, they dropped to 3.8 million in 2014, and rebounded to 5.6 million by 2016.

The most important industries in Crimea include food production, chemical fields, mechanical engineering, and metalworking, and fuel production industries. Sixty percent of the industry market belongs to food production. There are a total of 291 large industrial enterprises and 1002 small business enterprises.

In 2014, the republic's annual GDP was $4.3 billion (500 times smaller than the size of Russia's economy). The average salary was $290 per month. The budget deficit was $1.5 billion.

Agriculture
Agriculture in the region includes cereals, vegetable-growing, gardening, and wine-making, particularly in the Yalta and Massandra regions. Livestock production includes cattle breeding, poultry keeping, and sheep breeding. Other products produced on the Crimean Peninsula include salt, porphyry, limestone, and ironstone (found around Kerch) since ancient times.

The vine mealybug (Planococcus ficus) was first discovered here in 1868. First discovered on grape, it has also been found as a pest of some other crops and has since spread worldwide. Sunn pests—especially Eurygaster integriceps and E. maura—are significant grain pests. Scelioninae and Tachinidae are important parasitoids of sunnpest. Bark beetles are pests of tree crops, and are themselves hosts for Elattoma mites and various entomopathogenic fungi transmitted by those Elattomae.

Energy
Crimea also possesses several natural gas fields both onshore and offshore, which were starting to be drilled by western oil and gas companies before annexation. The inland fields are located in Chornomorske and Dzhankoi, while offshore fields are located in the western coast in the Black Sea and in the northeastern coast in the Azov Sea:

The republic also possesses two oil fields: one onshore, the Serebryankse oil field in Rozdolne, and one offshore, the Subbotina oil field in the Black Sea.

 Electricity

Crimea has 540 MW of its own electricity generation capacity, including the 100 MW Simferopol Thermal Power Plant, the 22 MW Sevastopol Thermal Power Plant and the 19 MW Kamish-Burunskaya Thermal Power Plant. This local electricity generation has proven insufficient for local consumption and since annexation by Russia, Crimea has been reliant on an underwater power cable to mainland Russia.

This power production is set to be bolstered by the building of and near start up of two combined cycle gas steam turbo thermal plants PGU, both providing 470 MW (116 167 MW GT, 235 MW block), a build (plant) by TPE along others with turbines provided by Power Machines (UTZ KalugaTZ ?), NPO Saturn with Perm PMZ; either GTD-110M modified or GTE-160 or 180 units or UTZ KTZ or a V94.2 bought by MAPNA, modified in Russian plants for PGU Thermal plants specifics.

Also many solar photovoltaic SES plants lie along the peninsula, in addition to a smaller facility north of Sevastopol. There also is the gas thermal Saky plant located close to Jodobrom chemical plant and SaKhZ(SaChP) boosted production with Perm GTE GTU25P (PS90GP25 25 MW aeroderivative GP) PGU turbogenerators. Older plants in operation include the Sevastopol TEC (close to Inkerman) which uses AEG and Ganz Elektro turbines and turbogenerators generating about 25 MW each, Sinferopol TEC (north, in Agrarne locale) Yepvatoria, Kamysh Burun TEC (Kerch south – Zaliv) and a few others.

Transport

Crimean Bridge

In May 2015, work began on a multibillion-dollar road-rail link (a pair of parallel bridges) across the Kerch Strait. The road bridge opened in May 2018, and the rail bridge opened in December 2019. With a length of 19 km, it is the longest bridge in Europe, as it overcame Vasco da Gama Bridge in Lisbon. This bridge was damaged during an attack on October 8, 2022.

Public transportation
Almost every settlement in Crimea is connected with another settlement by bus lines. Crimea contains the longest (96 km or 59 mi) trolleybus route in the world, founded in 1959, stretching from Simferopol to Yalta. The trolleybus line starts near Simferopol's Railway Station (in Soviet times it started near Simferopol International Airport) through the mountains to Alushta and on to Yalta. The length of line is about 90 km and passengers are assigned a seat. Simferopol, Yalta and Alushta also have an urban and suburban trolleybus network. Trolleybuses are also operated in Sevastopol and Kerch

In the city of Yevpatoria a tram system is also operated. In the nearby townlet village of Molochnoye, a 1.6 km-long tram line provides the only connection between the sea shore and a holiday resort, but its operation is halted since 2015.

Railway traffic
There are two railroad lines running through Crimea: the non-electrified Armiansk—Kerch (with a link to Feodosia), and the electrified Melitopol—Simferopol-Sevastopol (with a link to Yevpatoria), connecting Crimea to the Ukrainian mainland.

Until 2014 the network was part of the Cisdneper Directorate of the Ukrainian Railways. Long-distance trains provided connection to every major Ukrainian cities, but also to many towns of Russia, Belarus and until the end of the 2000es even to Vilnius, Riga, Warsaw and Berlin.

Since 2014 the railways are operated by the Crimea Railway. Local trains belong to the Yuzhnaya Prigorodnaya Passazhirskaya Kompaniya (Southern Suburban Passenger Company), serving the entire network of the peninsula and via the Crimean Bridge three trains daily to Anapa. Long-distance trains under the name Tavriya – operated by the company Grand Servis Ekspress – connect Sevastopol and Simferopol daily with Moscow and Saint Petersburg, in the summer season Yevpatoria and Feodosia are also directly connected by them. Several times a week Simferopol is also linked with Volgograd, Sochi, Yekaterinburg, Omsk and even Murmansk by train.

Further development plans consist a bypass line between Simferopol and Kerch, and a complete electrification of the network with changing the voltage of the already electrified lines from 3 kV DC to 25 kV 50 Hz AC.

International airport
Simferopol International Airport's new terminal opened in from April 2018 with the ability to handle 6.5 million passengers a year. It was built in 22 months and covers an area of 78,000 square meters.

Highways
 (under construction) Tavrida highway (route Yevpatoria-) Sevastopol – Simferopol (SW to W N to East ring) – Bilohirsk – north Feodosia – Kerch south (strait bridge)
 E105/M18 – Syvash (bridge, starts), Dzhankoi, North Crimean Canal (bridge), Simferopol, Alushta, Yalta (ends)
 E97/M17 – Perekop (starts), Armiansk, Dzhankoi, Feodosia, Kerch (ferry, ends)
 A290 – Novorossiysk to Kerch via the Crimean Bridge (formerly known as Highway M25)
 H05 – Krasnoperekopsk, Simferopol (access to the Simferopol International Airport)
 H06 – Simferopol, Bakhchysarai, Sevastopol
 H19 – Yalta, Sevastopol
 P16
 P23 – Simferopol, Feodosia
 P25 – Simferopol, Yevpatoria
 P27 – Sevastopol, Inkerman (completely within the city of Sevastopol)
 P29 – Alushta, Sudak, Feodosia
 P34 – Alushta, Yalta
 P35 – Hrushivka, Sudak
 P58 – Sevastopol, Port "Komysheva Bukhta" (completely within the city of Sevastopol)
 P59 (completely within the city of Sevastopol)

Sea transport
The cities of Yalta, Feodosia, Kerch, Sevastopol, Chornomorske and Yevpatoria are connected to one another by sea routes.

Tourism

The development of Crimea as a holiday destination began in the second half of the 19th century. The development of the transport networks brought masses of tourists from central parts of the Russian Empire.
At the beginning of the 20th century, a major development of palaces, villas, and dachas began—most of which remain. These are some of the main attractions of Crimea as a tourist destination. There are many Crimean legends about famous touristic places, which attract the attention of tourists.

A new phase of tourist development began when the Soviet government started promoting the healing quality of the local air, lakes and therapeutic muds. It became a "health" destination for Soviet workers, and hundreds of thousands of Soviet tourists visited Crimea.

Artek is a former Young Pioneer camp on the Black Sea in the town of Hurzuf, near Ayu-Dag, established in 1925. Unlike most of the young pioneer camps, Artek was an all-year camp, due to the warm climate. Artek was considered to be a privilege for Soviet children during its existence, as well as for children from other communist countries. During its heyday, 27,000 children a year vacationed at Artek. Between 1925 and 1969 the camp hosted 300,000 children. After the breaking up of the Young Pioneers in 1991 its prestige declined, though it remained a popular vacation destination.

In the 1990s, Crimea became more of a get-away destination than a "health-improvement" destination. The most visited areas are the south shore of Crimea with cities of Yalta and Alushta, the western shore – Yevpatoria and Saky, and the south-eastern shore – Feodosia and Sudak.
According to National Geographic, Crimea was among the top 20 travel destinations in 2013.

Places of interest include

Sanctions

Following Russia's largely unrecognized annexation of Crimea, the European Union, the United States, Canada, Australia, Japan, and several other countries (including Ukraine) imposed economic sanctions against Russia, including some specifically targeting Crimea. Many of these sanctions were directed at individuals—both Russian and Crimean. In general they prohibit the sale, supply, transfer, or export of goods and technology in several sectors, including services directly related to tourism and infrastructure. They list seven ports where cruise ships cannot dock. Sanctions against individuals include travel bans and asset freezes. Visa and MasterCard temporarily stopped service in Crimea in December 2014. The Russian national payment card system now allows Visa and MasterCard cards issued by Russian banks to work in Crimea. The Mir payment system operated by the Central Bank of Russia operates in Crimea as well as Master Card and Visa. However, there are no major international banks in the Crimea.

Politics 

Crimea is Ukrainian territory currently occupied by Russia; Ukraine has not relinquished title over the Crimean territory since the events of 2014, Crimea is internationally recognized as part of Ukraine. They exercise administration of the Autonomous Republic of Crimea from Kyiv in the Ministry of Reintegration of Temporarily Occupied Territories. Ukrainian president Zelenskiy drew attention to this fact in August 2022 when he stated that it was "necessary to liberate Crimea" from Russian occupation and to re-establish "world law and order".

Demographics

, the total population of the Republic of Crimea and Sevastopol was 2,248,400 people (Republic of Crimea: 1,889,485, Sevastopol: 395,000). This is down from the 2001 Ukrainian Census figure, which was 2,376,000 (Autonomous Republic of Crimea: 2,033,700, Sevastopol: 342,451).

According to the 2014 Russian census, 84% of Crimean inhabitants named Russian as their native language; 7.9% – Crimean Tatar; 3.7% – Tatar; and 3.3% – Ukrainian. It was the first official census in Crimea since a Ukrainian-held census in 2001.

According to the 2001 census, 77% of Crimean inhabitants named Russian as their native language; 11.4% – Crimean Tatar; and 10.1% – Ukrainian. In 2013, however, the Crimean Tatar language was estimated to be on the brink of extinction, being taught in Crimea only in around 15 schools at that point. Turkey provided the greatest support to Tatars in Ukraine, which had been unable to resolve the problem of education in their mother tongue in Crimea, by bringing the schools to a modern state.

Ethnic composition of Crimea's population has changed dramatically since the early 20th century. The 1897 Russian Empire Census for the Taurida Governorate reported: 196,854 (13.06%) Crimean Tatars, 404,463 (27.94%) Russians and 611,121 (42.21%) Ukrainians. But these numbers included Berdyansky, Dneprovsky and Melitopolsky uyezds which were on mainland, not in Crimea. The population number excluding these uyezds is given in the table below.

Crimean Tatars, a predominantly Muslim ethnic minority who in 2001 made up 12.1% of the population, formed in Crimea in the early modern era, after the Crimean Khanate had come into existence. The Crimean Tatars were forcibly expelled to Central Asia by Joseph Stalin's government as a form of collective punishment, on the grounds that some had joined the invading Waffen-SS, forming Tatar Legions, during World War II. After the fall of the Soviet Union, Crimean Tatars began to return to the region. According to the 2001 Ukrainian population census, 60% of the population of Crimea are ethnic Russians and 24% are ethnic Ukrainians.

Jews in Crimea were historically Krymchaks and Karaites (the latter a small group centered at Yevpatoria). The 1879 census for the Taurida Governorate reported a Jewish population of 4.20%, not including a Karaite population of 0.43%.
The Krymchaks (but not the Karaites) were targeted for annihilation during Nazi occupation.

The number of Crimea Germans was 60,000 in 1939. During WWII, they were forcibly deported on the orders of Stalin, as they were regarded as a potential "fifth column". This was part of the 800,000 Germans in Russia who were relocated within the Soviet Union during Stalinist times. The 2001 Ukrainian census reports just 2,500 ethnic Germans (0.1% of population) in Crimea.

Besides the Crimean Germans, Stalin in 1944 also deported 70,000 Greeks, 14,000 Bulgarians and 3,000 Italians.

Life expectancy at birth

Religion

In 2013, Orthodox Christians made up 58% of the Crimean population, followed by Muslims (15%) and believers in God without religion (10%).

Following the 2014 Russian annexation of Crimea, 38 out of the 46 Ukrainian Orthodox Church – Kyiv Patriarchate parishes in Crimea ceased to exist; in three cases, churches were seized by the Russian authorities. Notwithstanding the annexation, the Ukrainian Orthodox Church (Moscow Patriarchate) kept control of its eparchies in Crimea.

Culture

Alexander Pushkin visited Bakhchysarai in 1820 and later wrote the poem The Fountain of Bakhchisaray. Crimea was the background for Adam Mickiewicz's seminal work, The Crimean Sonnets inspired by his 1825 travel. A series of 18 sonnets constitute an artistic telling of a journey to and through the Crimea, they feature romantic descriptions of the oriental nature and culture of the East which show the despair of an exile longing for the homeland, driven from his home by a violent enemy.

Ivan Aivazovsky, the 19th-century marine painter of Armenian origin, who is considered one of the major artists of his era was born in Feodosia and lived there for the most part of his life. Many of his paintings depict the Black Sea. He also created battle paintings during the Crimean War.

Crimean Tatar singer Jamala won the Eurovision Song Contest 2016 representing Ukraine with her song "1944", about the historic deportation of Crimean Tatars in that year by Soviet authorities.

Sport
Following Crimea's vote to join Russia and subsequent annexation in March 2014, the top football clubs withdrew from the Ukrainian leagues. Some clubs registered to join the Russian leagues but the Football Federation of Ukraine objected. UEFA ruled that Crimean clubs could not join the Russian leagues but should instead be part of a Crimean league system. The Crimean Premier League is now the top professional football league in Crimea.

A number of Crimean-born athletes have been given permission to compete for Russia instead of Ukraine at future competitions, including Vera Rebrik, the European javelin champion. Due to Russia currently being suspended from all international athletic competitions Rebrik participates in tournaments as a "neutral" athlete.

Gallery

See also
 2014 Russian military intervention in Ukraine
 Crimean Gothic
 List of cities in Crimea
 Politics of Crimea
 Russian–Ukrainian Friendship Treaty of 1997
 International recognition of the Donetsk People's Republic and the Luhansk People's Republic

Notes

Explanatory notes

Citations

External links
 
 
 Lists of Crimean Tartar villages emptied in the May 1944 deportations, and most of them renamed in Russian

 
Crimean Tatars
Geographic regions of Ukraine
Peninsulas of Europe
Regions of Russia
Russian-speaking countries and territories
Turkic toponyms